The First Restoration was a period in French history that saw the return of the Bourbon dynasty to the throne, between the abdication of Napoleon I in the spring of 1814 and the Hundred Days, in March 1815. The regime was born following the victory of the Sixth Coalition (United Kingdom, Russia, Prussia, Sweden and Austria) as part of the campaign of France, while the country was in conflict during the First Empire. While the Allied powers were divided over the person to be placed on the throne of France, a subtle game was established between the Bourbons in exile, the French institutions and the foreign powers, before the abdication of Napoleon I on the 6th of April opened the way to Louis XVIII, brother of Louis XVI, who returned to Paris at the end of the month and moved to the palace of the Tuileries.

The new regime was constitutional: it was indeed, to reconcile the country, to mix the return to the monarchy with some of the major achievements of the French Revolution. To do this, the sovereign granted the French the Charter of 1814. The royal power was restored while preserving part of the rights of the individual acquired during the Revolution. During its short existence, the regime tried to reconcile the country. This method disappointed the most extreme monarchists, who hoped for vengeance for the wrongs suffered during the revolutionary period, while the return to power of the Church and the reduction of the size of armies quickly created enemies to the regime.

It was in this context that Napoleon I landed in France on March 1, 1815. With an army initially reduced, it federated the discontented and walked across the country. Louis XVIII fled Paris on March 19, and the regime fell the next day, at the arrival of Napoleon at the Tuileries. Louis XVIII went into exile in Ghent. It was only after the Hundred Days and the Battle of Waterloo that Louis XVIII was able return to the throne, inaugurating the Second Restoration.

Louis XVIII's restoration to the throne in 1814 was effected largely through the support of Napoleon's former foreign minister, Talleyrand, who convinced the victorious Allied Powers of the desirability of a Bourbon Restoration. The Allies had initially split on the best candidate for the throne: Britain favoured the Bourbons, the Austrians considered a regency for Napoleon's son, François Bonaparte, and the Russians were open to either the duc d'Orléans, Louis Philippe, or Jean-Baptiste Bernadotte, Napoleon's former Marshal, who was in line for the Swedish throne. Napoleon was offered to keep the throne in February 1814, on the condition that France return to its 1792 frontiers, but he refused. The feasibility of the Restoration was in doubt, but the allure of peace to a war-weary French public, and demonstrations of support for the Bourbons in Paris, Bordeaux, Marseille, and Lyons, helped reassure the Allies.

Louis, in accordance with the Declaration of Saint-Ouen, granted a written constitution, the Charter of 1814, which guaranteed a bicameral legislature with a hereditary/appointive Chamber of Peers and an elected Chamber of Deputies – their role was consultative (except on taxation), as only the King had the power to propose or sanction laws, and appoint or recall ministers. The franchise was limited to men with considerable property holdings, and just 1% of people could vote. Many of the legal, administrative, and economic reforms of the revolutionary period were left intact; the Napoleonic Code, which guaranteed some legal equality and civil liberties to men, the peasants' biens nationaux, and the new system of dividing the country into départments were not undone by the new king. Relations between church and state remained regulated by the Concordat of 1801. However, in spite of the fact that the Charter was a condition of the Restoration, the preamble declared it to be a "concession and grant", given "by the free exercise of our royal authority".

After a first sentimental flush of popularity, Louis' gestures towards reversing the results of the French Revolution quickly lost him support among the disenfranchised majority. Symbolic acts such as the replacement of the tricolore flag with the white flag, the titling of Louis as the "XVIII" (as successor to Louis XVII, who never ruled) and as "King of France" rather than "King of the French", and the monarchy's recognition of the anniversaries of the deaths of Louis XVI and Marie Antoinette were significant. A more tangible source of antagonism was the pressure applied to possessors of biens nationaux by the Catholic Church and returning émigrés attempting to repossess their former lands. Other groups bearing ill sentiment towards Louis included the army, non-Catholics, and workers hit by a post-war slump and British imports.

Footnotes 
Bourbon Restoration
1814 in France
1815 in France

References